Radosław Seweryś (born 10 January 2004) is a Polish professional footballer who plays as a defender for Korona Kielce.

Career statistics

Club

Notes

References

2004 births
Living people
Polish footballers
Poland youth international footballers
Association football defenders
Korona Kielce players
Ekstraklasa players
I liga players
III liga players